Lanuza, officially the Municipality of Lanuza (Surigaonon: Lungsod nan Lanuza), is a 4th class municipality in the province of Surigao del Sur, Philippines. According to the 2020 census, it has a population of 13,642 people.

History
On December 10, 1918, Executive Order No. 52 of American Governor General Francis Burton Harrison that was signed by Charles Yeater, divided Cantilan into three parts – Carrascal, present-day Cantilan and Lanuza. Now it is part of the settlement area called Carcanmadcarlan.

Geography

Barangays
Lanuza is politically subdivided into 13 barangays. In 1956, the sitio of Antao was converted into a barrio.

Climate

Lanuza has a tropical rainforest climate (Af) with heavy to very heavy rainfall year-round and with extremely heavy rainfall frfrom December to February.

Demographics

Economy

Lanuza belongs to the economic zone of Cantilan, one of the major economic zones of Surigao del Sur. Business opportunity is mainly dependent on agriculture, fishing, and eco-tourism. Lanuza was awarded a "clean and green" municipality title of the Caraga Region.

For telecommunication there are six cell sites operated by Smart Communications and Globe Telecom that cover the whole area of CarCanMadCarLan (Carrascal, Cantilan, Madrid, Carmen and Lanuza).

Two cable TV providers operate in Cantilan, Carrascal and Madrid. Cantilan has broadband internet with a number of internet cafes. The municipal building in Lanuza has a satellite connection, soon this will be extended to the school and may be offered as an internet cafe in the evenings.

Lanuza is noted as a surfing destination with its various surfing areas from Reef Breaks to Beach Breaks. Surfing season is between the months of November to March where big waves are in constant motion.

References

External links
 Lanuza Profile at PhilAtlas.com
 Lanuza Profile at the DTI Cities and Municipalities Competitive Index
 [ Philippine Standard Geographic Code]
 Philippine Census Information
 Local Governance Performance Management System 
 SurfLanuza - Surfing Gateway of the Philippines

Municipalities of Surigao del Sur
Surfing locations in the Philippines